Ted Dawson may refer to:

 Ted Dawson (rugby league) (born 1923), Australian rugby league footballer
 Ted M. Dawson (born 1959), American neurologist and neuroscientist